The 1923–24 Rugby Union County Championship was the 31st edition of England's premier rugby union club competition at the time.

Cumberland won the competition for the first time after defeating Kent in the final.

Semifinals

Final

See also
 English rugby union system
 Rugby union in England

References

Rugby Union County Championship
County Championship (rugby union) seasons